Lafayette Street is a major north-south street in New York City's  Lower Manhattan. It originates at the intersection of Reade Street and Centre Street, one block north of Chambers Street. The one-way street then successively runs through Chinatown, Little Italy, NoLIta, and NoHo and finally, between East 9th and East 10th Streets, merges with Fourth Avenue.  A buffered bike lane runs outside the left traffic lane. North of Spring Street, Lafayette Street is northbound (uptown)-only; south of Spring Street, Lafayette is southbound (downtown)-only.

The street is named after the Marquis de Lafayette, a French hero of the American Revolutionary War.

History

Early years (1804-1887)

The street originated as a real estate speculation by John Jacob Astor, who had bought a large market garden in 1804, for $45,000, and leased part of the site to a Frenchman named Joseph Delacroix, who erected a popular resort and called it "Vauxhall Gardens" after the famous resort on the edge of London. When the lease expired in 1825, Astor cut a new street through, a 100-foot wide three-block boulevard with no cross streets, which began at Astor Place and ended at Great Jones Street which he named Lafayette Place to commemorate the Revolutionary war hero, who had returned to a rapturous reception in America the previous year. Lots along both sides of the new street sold briskly, earning Astor many times what he had paid for the land two decades before. The grandest was the terrace of matching marble-fronted Greek Revival houses on the west side of the street, called La Grange Terrace when it was built in 1833, but known to New Yorkers as "Colonnade Row" for the two-story order of Corinthian columns that unified its fronts; the nine residences each sold for as much as $30,000; four that remain are the only survivors of the first fashionable residential phase of Lafayette Street, which gained its new name when the city extended the street south in the early 1900s. At that time its route was carved from the former Elm Street, Marion Street, and Lafayette Place and connected to Centre Street at the Municipal Building.

Later developments (1888-present)
The change in Lafayette Street's history is epitomized by the construction of the Schermerhorn Building in 1888 to replace the Schermerhorn mansion, where Mrs. William Colford Schermerhorn had redecorated the interior to resemble Louis XV's Versailles, it was thought, to give a French-themed costume ball in 1854 for six hundred New Yorkers, at which the German Cotillion was introduced in America. A sign of changing times, in 1860 the W.C. Schermerhorns moved uptown to 49 West 23rd Street. Before long, half of Colonnade Row was demolished to make way for a warehouse for Wanamaker's Department Store. Wanamaker's had taken over A.T. Stewart's palatial dry-goods store that occupied the full block between Broadway and Lafayette and 9th and 10th Streets, and had also built an equally gigantic Annex next door between 8th and 9th Streets, with a skywalk connecting the two buildings. The main store  burnt down in 1956, but the annex and warehouse buildings remain extant on Lafayette.

Landmarks
Landmarks along Lafayette Street include:

The New York Mercantile Library building at Astor Place (George E. Harney, arch., 1891), once the site of the Astor Opera House, now condominiums
Alamo, a cube-shaped sculpture in Astor Place
 Astor Library (1854), founded by John Jacob Astor, now housing The Public Theater
Colonnade Row (1833), four of a series of nine Greek revival row houses; the Astor Place Theatre is in one
The Schermerhorn Building, built for the Schermerhorns in 1888 to designs by Henry Janeway Hardenbergh, to replace the Schermerhorn mansion.
339 Lafayette Street, dubbed the "Peace Pentagon" for the many left-wing organizations which were once headquartered there, including the War Resisters League
The Puck Building on East Houston Street
The New York City Rescue Mission on White Street
The Firehouse, Engine Company 31 building is located at 87 Lafayette at White Street, built in 1895 by Napoleon LeBrun, now the Downtown Community Television Center (DCTV)
The Ahrens Building, built by George Henry Griebel, and the City Municipal Court Building on the south side of White Street
Family Court on Franklin Street
The Department of Health, Hospitals and Sanitation on Leonard Street
Federal Plaza, which includes the Jacob Javits Federal Building on Worth Street
Foley Square, named after Tammany Hall's "Big Tom" Foley, on Pearl Street
The SoHo-Cast Iron Historic District Extension

Summer Streets
For three Saturdays in August 2008 the New York City Department of Transportation closed Lafayette Street, Park Avenue, and part of East 72nd Street to motor traffic, as a "Summer Streets" program to encourage non-motor uses.  This program has been renewed every year since then, and takes place on the first, second, and third Saturdays of every August.

Transportation

The New York City Subway's  intersect at a subway station complex at Bleecker Street / Broadway – Lafayette Street. The IRT Lexington Avenue Line runs under Lafayette Street, with stops at Canal Street, Spring Street, Bleecker Street, and Astor Place, as well as a former stop at Worth Street. The southbound M22 serves a short segment between Worth Street and Chambers Street.

Gallery

See also

Lower Manhattan
Lower East Side
Merchant's House Museum
NoHo

References
Notes

Further reading
Eaton, Walter Prichard “Lafayette Place,” pp. 16–27 (see also pp. 13–4) in Henry Collins Brown, ed. Valentine’s Manual of the City of New York 1917–1918 New Series No. 2 (The Old Colony Press, New York, 1917) at Internet Archive
"The Future Elm Street", The New York Times, January 6, 1895
Presa, Donald G. et al. NoHo Historic District Designation Report, New York City Landmarks Preservation Commission (June 29, 1999), p. 6–7

External links

Lafayette Street Storefronts – photographs of buildings and stores along Lafayette Street.
New York Songlines: Lafayette Street

Streets in Manhattan
Five Points, Manhattan
Civic Center, Manhattan